Ujjain South Assembly constituency is one of the 230 Vidhan Sabha (Legislative Assembly) constituencies of Madhya Pradesh state in central India. This constituency came into existence in 1951, as one of the 79 Vidhan Sabha constituencies of the erstwhile Madhya Bharat state.

Overview 

Ujjain South (constituency number 217) is one of the 7 Vidhan Sabha constituencies located in Ujjain district. This constituency covers the R.I.Circle including Lalpur OG of Ujjain Tehsil, ward numbers 33, and 36 to 54 of the Ujjain Municipal Corporation. Ujjain Dakshin is part of Ujjain (Lok Sabha constituency) along with eight other Vidhan Sabha segments covering the entire Ujjain district and part of Ratlam district.

Members of Legislative Assembly

See also

 Ujjain
 Ujjain (Lok Sabha constituency)

References

Assembly constituencies of Madhya Pradesh
Politics of Ujjain
Constituencies established in 1951
1951 establishments in India